Marcus Philip Kelly (born 16 March 1986) is an English footballer who plays as a midfielder for Peterborough Sports.

Career

Rushden & Diamonds
Born in Kettering, Northamptonshire, Kelly began his career playing for Second Division side Rushden & Diamonds. After impressing in the reserve team, he made his debut in a 3–0 home defeat to AFC Bournemouth on 27 March 2004.

Kettering Town
Kelly completed his permanent transfer to his hometown club Kettering Town on 7 January 2010.

Tamworth
On 5 July 2012, Kelly signed for Tamworth, along with former Kettering teammate Adam Cunnington and Tommy Wright, with Kelly and Cunnington teaming up with their former manager at Kettering, Marcus Law. Kelly scored his first goal for Tamworth away at Hyde in a 2–1 defeat. He scored a hat-trick in the FA Trophy first round against Lincoln City to ensure Tamworth progressed to the second round.

Forest Green Rovers
Kelly signed a one-year-deal at Forest Green Rovers on 17 July 2013, after impressing management while on trial during pre-season – including a 2–0 win over League One side Swindon Town having been recommended to the club by Marcus Law. He made his debut for the club on 10 August 2013 where he scored a hat-trick in an 8–0 win over Hyde. In February 2014, he signed a contract extension keeping him at the club until the summer of 2015.

At the end of his first season at the club, he was voted Supporters Player of the Year, Players Player of the Year and won the club's Goal of the Season award. In February 2015, he agreed a new one-year contract with Forest Green, keeping him at The New Lawn until the end of the 2015–16 season. He made his hundredth league appearance for the club on 9 April 2016 in a 1–1 away draw against Braintree Town.

Wrexham
On 23 June 2017, Kelly joined Wrexham on a one-year deal.

Kelly was released by Wrexham in May 2018.

Return to Kettering Town
Following his release from Wrexham, Kelly would drop two levels down the football pyramid to rejoin Kettering Town on 13 July 2018, the team now playing in the Southern Football League Premier Central. At the end of the 2018-19 season he helped Kettering to achieve promotion to the National League North as champions.

Nuneaton Borough
At the end of the curtailed 2019-20 season Kelly was released by Kettering and signed for Nuneaton Borough

Peterborough Sports
After leaving Nuneaton Borough in September 2021, Kelly signed for league rivals Peterborough Sports in October 2021.

Career statistics

References

External links

1986 births
Living people
Sportspeople from Kettering
English footballers
Association football midfielders
Rushden & Diamonds F.C. players
Oxford United F.C. players
Kettering Town F.C. players
Mansfield Town F.C. players
Tamworth F.C. players
Forest Green Rovers F.C. players
English Football League players
National League (English football) players
Wrexham A.F.C. players